The 2007 CFU Club Championship was the annual international football club competition held in the Caribbean Football Union (CFU) region. Nineteen teams were to compete in the tournament, from November 4 to November 16 in six venues in Trinidad and Tobago. The first round consisted of five groups played in a round-robin format.  The first round group winners along with the three best second-place teams advanced to the quarterfinals. The Caribbean Tournament Champion qualified to the 2008 CONCACAF Champions Cup.

The champion, runner-up and the third place team qualify for the 2008-09 CONCACAF Champions League. A playoff between the two losing semifinal teams will decide the 3rd place team.

St.Kitts & Nevis Newtown United and Positive Vibes of the US Virgin Islands withdrew from the competition on November 2 and the fixtures were rearranged.

Participation
The following teams took part in the 2007 competition.
  Deportivo Nacional (Aruba)
  RCA (Aruba)
  Bassa FC (Antigua and Barbuda)
  SAP (Antigua and Barbuda)
   Pinar del Río (Cuba)
  South East FC (Dominica)
  Baltimore SC (Haiti)
  Harbour View (Jamaica)
  Portmore United (Jamaica)
  Puerto Rico Islanders (Puerto Rico)
  Jong Colombia (Netherlands Antilles)
  Centro Barber (Netherlands Antilles)
  Inter Moengotapoe (Suriname)
  SV Leo Victor (Suriname)
  San Juan Jabloteh (Trinidad and Tobago)
  Joe Public (Trinidad and Tobago)
  Helenites (U.S. Virgin Islands)

Teams that withdrew
Two teams were due to take part, but withdrew before the beginning of the competition.
 Positive Vibes FC (U.S. Virgin Islands)
 Newtown United FC (St Kitts and Nevis)

Did not enter
The following federations were entitled to enter teams in the competition but declined to, often because of the cost of competing.
 Guyana
 Anguilla
 Turks and Caicos
 British Virgin Islands
 Bermuda
 Montserrat
 Bahamas
 St. Lucia
 St. Vincent and the Grenadines
 Grenada
 Cayman Islands
 Dominican Republic
 Barbados
 French Guiana
 Guadeloupe
 Martinique
 Saint Martin
 Sint Maarten

First round

Group A
Group A took place in the Port of Spain, Trinidad

Group B
Group B was played in Macoya and Couva.

Group C
Group C was played in Marabella

Group D
Group D was played in Malabar and Macoya

Group E
Group E was played in Pointe-à-Pierre

Quarter-finals

Semifinals

Final

3rd Place

Notes

2007
2007–08 in Caribbean football
2007 in Trinidad and Tobago football
2007